Chakravyuh ( more idiomatically puzzle) is a 2012 Indian Hindi-language political action thriller film directed by Prakash Jha starring Arjun Rampal in the lead role with Abhay Deol, Esha Gupta, Manoj Bajpayee and Anjali Patil in supporting roles. Chakravyuh aims to be a social commentary on the issue of Naxalites. The first theatrical trailer of Chakravyuh was released at midnight on 16–17 August 2012. The film released on Durga Puja. Chakravyuh released in 1100 cinemas in India. Despite being well-praised, the movie failed to attract an audience.

Plot
Adil Khan (Arjun Rampal), a highly decorated police officer is posted to Nandighat, after martyrdom of 84 policemen and CRPF soldiers. Within days, he discovers that the Maoists, led by Rajan (Manoj Bajpayee), effectively control the area. They are able to swiftly thwart Adil's most determined efforts. Despite holding a position of enormous power as the SSP of Nandighat, Adil has never felt so helpless in his career.

But then, into his life, re-enters his friend Kabir (Abhay Deol). Rootless, aimless, the quintessential rolling stone. His only anchor in life has always been his friendship with and his loyalty for Adil. The maverick proposes an outrageous plan: He will infiltrate Rajan's group and be Adil's informer, and together they will smash the Maoist organization in Nandighat. In spite of his apprehensions, Adil agrees.

Sure enough, Kabir gets in and craftily wins their confidence, as only he can. He secretly begins informing Adil, who starts attacking the Naxals with great success. An enormous cache of arms is raided; two top national leaders and 63 Naxals are killed at an arms-training camp, and Rajan himself is captured. Within weeks, Adil-Kabir turn the game, pushing the Maoists onto the back foot.

But Kabir also begins sympathising with abject helplessness of the rural poor, brutally displaced in the name of development, the fruits of which never reach them; their land, their forest, their water has been snatched to allow big business to exploit the area and its people further.

Kabir begins identifying and with Naxals. Juhi (Anjali Patil), a dedicated Naxal with a tender heart, who has seen pain like none other. She begins to fall in love with Kabir. The confusion in Kabir's heart intensifies dangerously until he is on the horns of a ghastly dilemma: Who does he support now? Who does he fight? He finds himself in a chakravyuh (labyrinth) from which there is no retreat now.

And yet, before Kabir can make one last desperate attempt to resolve this with his friend Adil, events hurtle him into making choices that would put him at war with him. A war that would change the future of the region. A war that can end only when one of them destroys the other.

Cast
 Arjun Rampal as Adil Khan IPS (Senior Superintendent of Police, Nandighat).
He is the protagonist of the movie. He is a police officer and is on a mission to target the Naxals and capture their leader Rajan and ideologue Govind Suryavanshi. He sends his friend Kabir as an informer to get their information and foil their plans.
Esha Gupta as Rhea Menon IPS
She is an IPS officer and Adil's wife.
 Abhay Deol as Kabir / Comrade Azad
He is Adil's best friend who infiltrates the Naxal movement as an informer. He initially supports Adil in the mission but slowly starts getting impressed with the Naxals and becomes their leader, thus entering a stand-off with Adil.       
 Anjali Patil as Juhi
She is a Naxalite commander, playing a key role in the argument. She also develops romantic feelings towards Kabir.
 Manoj Bajpayee as Rajan
 He is the leader of Naxalites.
 Om Puri as Govind Suryavanshi
He is the chief Marxist ideologue. Om Puri role is said to be inspired from Kobad Ghandy.
 Kabir Bedi as Prashanth Mahanta, Chairman Of Mahanta Group Industries
He is an industrialist, businessman and negotiator for the government. Aaditya Mahanta's father.
 Tanvir Singh as Aaditya Mahanta, Prashanth Mahanta's son.
 Mukesh Tiwari as IG.
 S M Zaheer as DGP Prashant Rathod IPS
 Murli Sharma as Naxalite area commander Naga.
 Chetan Pandit as Inspector Madhav Rao.
 Daya Shankar Pandey as Inspector Raja Ram.
 Anand Suryavanshi as Kamal Kishore IPS aka K.K.
 Kiran Karmarkar as Home Minister.
 Radhakrishna Dutta as Chief Minister
 Sameera Reddy in an item song Kunda Khol
 Jagat Singh as Keshav.
 Amit Jairath as R.K.Singh, CRPF Officer 
 Sharmin Tithi (Bagmara)
 Zuyel Rana (Natore)

Production
Chakravyuh is shot in Panchmarhi and Bhopal. The movie was shot at Trinity Institute of Technology And Research, Bhopal and some scenes were shot at IES and MLB college. The entire schedule of shooting was wrapped up in about 57 days. The Madhya Zonal Committee of the CPI (Maoist), has expressed gratitude for the film has, however, pointed out a few facts which are not in consonance with "their world". Maoists have given full credit to the film for being close to reality. Jha on his turn has said it was possible because of intense research in finalising the script, costumes and the plot.

Crew
Sandeep Vyas as Production Management

Promotion
Prakash Jha has come up with a unique way to promote his upcoming socio-political thriller Chakravyuh by launching an online comic series. The first episode of the series, 'The Sohble Encounters', starts with a bunch of youngsters rounded up from a party by Inspector Sohble (needless to say a clear dig at Inspector Dhoble). Jha has managed to pitch it cleverly in the backdrop of his film. The first instalment of the series went online.

Soundtrack
Music for this film is composed by Salim–Sulaiman, Aadesh Shrivastava, Shantanu Moitra, Sandesh Shandilya, Vijay Verma, lyrics by Irshad Kamil, Panchhi Jalonvi, Ashish Sahu, A. M. Turaz. One song Tata, Birla, Ambani aur Bata had run into trouble with the Censor Board but was passed after a disclaimer saying these names have been used symbolically and it does not mean any harm or disrespect to any individual or brand. One song Kunda Khol is picturised on Sameera Reddy and Murali sharma. There is item song  Tambai Rang Tera in the film, choreographed by Ganesh Acharya. Musicperk.com rated the album 6/10 quoting "This formation doesn’t work".

Track listing

Release

Critical reception
Upon release, Chakravyuh received mixed to positive reviews from critics. The Times of India gave 3.5 stars out of 5. According to TOI, "Chakravyuh is a hard film to make and marks must be given to Jha for sticking his neck out. Staying true to the subject, he gives us an insight into uncomfortable truths unfolding in our backyard. He is one of the few filmmakers with such audacious work to his credit."
Subhash K. Jha of Indo-Asian News Service gave the movie 4/5 stars and called it a "resolutely etched, firmly grounded drama".
Bikas Bhagat of Zeenews gave the movie 4/5 and wrote in their review, "Here’s a fight which we have heard about and seen through the ages – the fight between the Capitalists and the Communists. Prakash Jha presents it in his own way; and going by illustrious line of work, it would be a big mistake on your part if you happen to give 'Chakravyuh' a miss."
Gautam Batra & Roma Heer of Wassupbollywood gave the movie 2/5 saying, "Chakravyuh is surely a great concept but fails drastically on screen. Watch Prakash Jha’s past flicks on CD/DVD instead of wasting your time & money on it. Not Recommended." Sukanya Verma of Rediff gave the movie 2.5/5 stars and wrote, "Chakravyuh maintains an aggressive cinematic tone with sufficient stock of blood and action to dole, but is nothing more than an average action flick in the garb of relevant cinema".
According to Hindustan times, Chakravyuh is, ultimately, a victim of typical Bollywood excesses and gave 2.5 out of 5 stars. Bollywood portal Films of India said, "Shot flawlessly the movie is raw, gritty, with no frills. Watch Chakravyuh for its performances and high intense drama. If you’re a person who likes to use their mind, then the 3 and a half star Chakravyuh is definitely the movie for you."

Box office

India

Overseas
Chakravyuh grossed $300,000 in extended 5-day weekend in overseas.

Awards and nominations

See also
 Bollywood films of 2012

References

External links
 
 
 
 

2012 films
Films directed by Prakash Jha
Films about Naxalism
Films scored by Shantanu Moitra
Films scored by Salim–Sulaiman
Films scored by Sandesh Shandilya
Films scored by Aadesh Shrivastava
Fictional portrayals of police departments in India